Sham Wedding/Hoax Funeral is a split CD featuring Austin, Texas "brother bands" Okkervil River and Shearwater. It was first available only at North American tour dates in the spring and summer of 2004, but fans later were able to purchase it online. The tracks include demos, unreleased songs and old standards. Mark Pedini, former drummer of Okkervil River, provided the artwork for the album cover.

The song "Murderess" was later released in different form as "Piratess" on Okkervil River's 2011 album I Am Very Far.

Track listing
Sham Wedding by Okkervil River
"See See Rider" – 4:56
"Murderess" – 5:02
"Moonshiner" – 1:59
"Willow Tree" – 3:53
"Unravel" (Björk / Guy Sigsworth) – 4:42

Hoax Funeral by Shearwater
"All the Pretty Horses" (traditional) – 4:26
"Happy Song for My Friends" – 2:47
"Cool My Blood" – 4:46
"Mountain Laurel" – 2:22
"Trouble in Mind" (Richard M. Jones) – 3:47
"Never Come Again" – 3:44

External links
Album Summary from Okkervil River

2004 albums
Okkervil River albums
Shearwater (band) albums
Jagjaguwar albums
Split albums